The Gibson Super 400 is an archtop guitar. It is a highly influential guitar model that inspired many other master guitar builders (including Elmer Stromberg and John D'Angelico). It was first sold in 1934 and named for its $400 price, like many Gibson guitars of that era.

The Super 400 features solid carved-wood construction, and at the time of its introduction was the largest guitar that the Gibson Guitar Corporation had produced. Until 1939, it had a hand-engraved tailpiece and a hand-engraved finger rest support. During the very early production stock the truss rod cover had engraved "L5 Super"; on later guitars this was changed to "Super 400".

In 1939 the guitar was changed. The upper bout was enlarged, and the hand-engraved tailpiece was replaced with the one still fitted today on current Super 400s. The f-holes were slightly enlarged and a cutaway option also became available. This was called the Super 400P (for Premiere), later changed to C for Cutaway.

During the 1950s, Gibson released the Super 400 CES (Cutaway•Electric•Spanish). This had a slightly thicker top to reduce feedback, two P-90 pickups, and individual tone and volume controls, along with a three-way toggle switch. Later, the P-90 pickups were replaced with Alnico V pickups, then in 1957, humbucking pickups.

There have been variations in the limited edition custom models. In 2000 Gibson offered the Super 400 with a Charlie Christian pickup. The Super 400 is still available today, with two humbucker pickups. The full acoustic version is no longer  available.

The 1963 Gibson Super 400 CES Florentine model belonging to Scotty Moore played an important role in Elvis Presley's stage performance, the '68 Comeback Special.

See also
Gibson Guitar Corporation product list

References

External links 

Super 400 at Gibson website
Super 400 Review and Demo Video - Flash Required

Super 400
Semi-acoustic guitars